Teodorówka may refer to the following places:
Teodorówka, Gmina Biłgoraj in Lublin Voivodeship (east Poland)
Teodorówka, Gmina Frampol in Lublin Voivodeship (east Poland)
Teodorówka, Subcarpathian Voivodeship (south-east Poland)
Teodorówka, Masovian Voivodeship (east-central Poland)
Teodorówka, Opole Voivodeship (south-west Poland)